Teresita may refer to:

 Teresita (given name), a feminine given name
 Teresita (genus), a genus of moths in the family Oecophoridae
 Teresita, Missouri, United States, an unincorporated community
 Teresita, Oklahoma, United States, an unincorporated community and census-designated place

See also 
 Santa Teresita (disambiguation)
 La Teresita, Cuban cuisine restaurant in Tampa, Florida